The 1977 CONCACAF Championship, the seventh edition of the CONCACAF Championship, was held in Mexico from 8 to 23 October. Mexico, as the host nation, easily secured a third title and a place in Argentina '78 since the tournament also served as qualification to the World Cup. The North, Central American and Caribbean zone was allocated 1 place (out of 16) in the final tournament.

Qualification

Venues

Final round

Mexico qualified for the 1978 FIFA World Cup.

Goalscorers

6 goals

 Víctor Rangel

4 goals

 Hugo Sánchez

3 goals

 Buzz Parsons
 Elmer Rosas

2 goals

 Mike Bakić
 Luis Ramírez Zapata
 Norberto Huezo
 Felix McDonald
 Mario René Alfaro
 José Emilio Mitrovich
 Sergio Rivera
 Leintz Domingue
 Alfred Jiménez
 Javier Cárdenas
 Javier Guzmán
 Raul Isiordia
 Edwin Schal
 Remie Olmberg

1 goal

 Bob Lenarduzzi
 Brian Budd
 Mágico González
 Arsène Auguste
 Pierre Bayonne
 Guy Dorsainville
 Emmanuel Sanon
 Arturo Vázquez Ayala
 Rafael Chávez
 Delano Rigters
 Errol Emanuelson

See also
1978 FIFA World Cup qualification
1978 FIFA World Cup qualification (UEFA)
1978 FIFA World Cup qualification (CONMEBOL)
1978 FIFA World Cup qualification (CAF)
1978 FIFA World Cup qualification (AFC and OFC)

External links
 1978 FIFA World Cup qualification (CONCACAF) at FIFA.com

 
1977
1977
Championship
1977
1977–78 in Guatemalan football
1977–78 in Mexican football
1977–78 in Salvadoran football
1977 in Canadian soccer
October 1977 sports events in North America
October 1977 events in Mexico
Sport in Monterrey
Sports competitions in Mexico City
1970s in Mexico City
qual
20th century in Monterrey